Cold Feet is a British comedy-drama television series that was written by Mike Bullen and produced by Christine Langan, Spencer Campbell and Emma Benson. The pilot episode was first broadcast on the ITV network on 30 March 1997. Critical acclaim and good ratings for a repeat broadcast led to ITV commissioning a series from production company Granada Television; 32 episodes over five series were broadcast from 15 November 1998 to 16 March 2003, the sixth series was broadcast in 2016. Episodes were typically produced for a 60-minute timeslot on the commercial ITV network. Series 5 had its runtime increased to fill a 90-minute timeslot. All episodes of the first five series have been released on VHS and DVD, and have been made available on itv.com and ITV's iTunes Store.

Series overview

Episodes

Pilot (1997) 
The pilot episode was the first episode of Granada's Comedy Premieres programming strand, made up of four television pilots that were broadcast across 1997. This episode is 52 minutes long and was produced in 1996. It introduces the six main characters and features music by The Other Two, Space and Saint Etienne. The episode was directed by Father Teds Declan Lowney.

Series 1 (1998) 

The first series of six episodes was broadcast from 15 November to 20 December 1998. It was commissioned in August 1997 after the pilot won the Golden Rose of Montreux. The series was broadcast on Sunday nights in the 9.30 p.m. timeslot. The first three episodes were repeated on Saturday nights, ahead of the broadcast of Series 2. The first episode begins nine months after the end of the pilot.

Series 2 (1999) 

A second series of six episodes was commissioned by ITV before the first had concluded broadcast. This series' episodes played up the non-linear structure of the first series episodes, using more flashbacks and fantasy scenes. It was first broadcast from 26 September to 31 October 1999. Executive producer Andy Harries had the series moved to the 9 p.m. timeslot, annoying advertisers. The first episode begins nine months after the end of the first series.

Series 3 (2000) 

The third series was extended from six to eight episodes on the success of the first two series. ITV had asked Granada for up to 20 episodes, but were refused on the basis that it would turn the show into a soap opera. The episodes suffered from ITV's decision to insert a third commercial break into evening programming; like many other series that had already completed post-production, Cold Feets editors were forced to alter their episodes to allow for the extra breaks. The first two episodes were broadcast as a single two-hour episode on 12 November. Episode 8, featuring Adam and Rachel's wedding, was broadcast on Boxing Day—the first time the show aired on a Tuesday. During pre-production, Mike Bullen declined to write the episodes, believing that all the stories that could be told had been told. His interest was eventually renewed and he wrote four episodes, leaving the other four to David Nicholls. For Episode 5, the cast and crew spent several days filming in Portrush and Belfast in Northern Ireland. The series was first broadcast from 5 November to 26 December 2000.

Series 4 (2001) 

The storyline for the fourth series was conceived by Mike Bullen and Andy Harries while they were on a speaking tour of Australia; Bullen wanted to set an episode in Sydney because it was "a nice place to go". Fay Ripley left the series in Episode 2, so a replacement cast member, Kimberley Joseph as Jo Ellison, was introduced in Episode 1. Over the series, Pete and Jo fall in love and get married in Sydney in Episode 8. The episode was filmed on location in Sydney in October 2001. Bullen wrote it as a normal episode of Cold Feet that just happened to be set in Australia. This episode was extended to fill a 90-minute timeslot.

Series 5 (2003) 

At the conclusion of the third series, Bullen announced that he did not want to write a fifth series, and that the fourth would be the last. Series 4, Episode 8 was produced as the final episode but the cast and crew realised that they would like to make one final series for proper closure. Bullen agreed to write the final episodes on the condition that there would be just four, and that he could kill off a character. Matt Greenhalgh co-wrote Episode 3 with Bullen, specifically the scenes depicting Rachel's death. Fay Ripley returned as Jenny for the final episode. As her pregnancy was nearly complete, Episode 4 was filmed before Episode 3 to accommodate her schedule. A retrospective documentary entitled Cold Feet: The Final Call was broadcast on 11 March, between the broadcasts of Episode 3 and Episode 4, gaining 4.8 million viewers. Episode 1 begins three months after the end of the fourth series. The DVD release of Series 5 has the four episodes reformatted into six episodes of approximately 50 minutes each.

Series 6 (2016)

Series 7 (2017)

Series 8 (2019)

ITV commissioned an eighth series of Cold Feet, the third since its 2016 reboot, on 30 October 2017. The series premiered on Monday, 14 January 2019.

Series 9 (2020)

Notes

References 
 Smith, Rupert (2003). Cold Feet: The Complete Companion. (London: Granada Media). .
 Tibballs, Geoff (2000). Cold Feet: The Best Bits.... (London: Granada Media). .
 Weekly Viewing Summary: Terrestrial Top 30. Broadcasters' Audience Research Board.

Lists of British comedy-drama television series episodes